is a Japanese professional shogi player ranked 7-dan.

Early life
Kinoshita was born in Nagano Prefecture on August 29, 1967. As a junior high school student, he won the 3rd  in 1982, and later that same year entered the Japan Shogi Association's apprentice school at the rank of 6-kyū under the guidance of shogi professional . He was promoted to apprentice professional 1-dan in 184, and obtained full professional status and the rank of 4-dan in 1988.

Shogi professional
In March 2009, Kinoshita declared his intention to the Japan Shogi Association to become a Free Class player as of April 2009.

Promotion history
The promotion history for Kinoshita is as follows:
 6-kyū: 1982
 1-dan: 1984
 4-dan: April 1, 1988
 5-dan: June 8, 1993
 6-dan: February 19, 2001
 7-dan: April 1, 2017

References

External links
 ShogiHub: Kinoshita, Koichi

Japanese shogi players
Living people
Professional shogi players from Nagano Prefecture
1967 births